William Baillie may refer to:
W. D. H. Baillie (1827–1922), New Zealand politician
William Baillie, Lord Provand (died 1593), Scottish judge
William Baillie, Lord Polkemmet (1736–1816), Scottish judge
William Baillie (soldier) (died 1653), Scottish professional soldier
William Baillie (engraver) (1723–1810), Irish artist
William Baillie (artist) (1752/3–1799), British artist, active in Calcutta
William Baillie (East India Company officer) (died 1782), British lieutenant-colonel
Sir William Baillie, 2nd Baronet (1816–1890), Scottish MP for Linlithgowshire
William Baillie (cricketer) (1838–1895), English cricketer
Bill Baillie (1934–2018), New Zealand runner